Valentyn Gvozdiy (born 31 March 1979, Sviatets, Teofipol Raion Khmelnytskyi Oblast, Ukrainian SSR) is a Ukrainian attorney at law. Head of the Supervisory Board of Ukrhydroenergo PJSC. 

Valentyn is a member of the Berlin Bar Association (Rechtsanwaltskammer Berlin) as a foreign lawyer from Ukraine, IBA (International Bar Association), GCLC (Global Criminal Law Council), ECBA (European Criminal Bar Association), AEEC (Associated European Energy Consultants).

Education 

In 2001 Valentyn Gvozdiy graduated from the Law Faculty of Yu. Fedkovych Chernivtsi National University. Valentyn continued his studies at the Manchester Business School, where in 2016 he got a degree in Corporate Management, Risk Management, and Compliance.

In the following years, he devoted himself to scientific work, in particular, to writing the dissertation on Administrative and Legal Status of Bar Self-Government Bodies. His graduation took place in 2020 at the West Ukrainian National University. He got an academic degree (Ph.D.) in Administrative Law and Process; Financial Law; Information Law.

In November–December 2021, Valentyn completed special programs in Corporate Governance at Harvard Business School. As a result of his studies, he received Harvard Business School Corporate Director certificate. The program of the study consisted of four courses: Making Corporate Boards More Effective; Audit Committees in a New Era of Governance; Compensation Committees: New Challenges, New Solutions; Risk Management for Corporate Leaders.

Career 

In 1999 Valentyn started his career as an attorney assistant in Khmelnytskyi in the office of Klara Marhulian.  He soon started working in Kyiv, where in 2003 together with partners he started GOLAW law firm with offices in Kyiv and Berlin, currently being a Managing Partner of the firm.

In 2012 he was elected as a Vice-President of the Ukrainian National Bar Association, as well as the Bar Council of Ukraine. In 5 years he was re-elected as a Vice-President of the Ukrainian National Bar Association, the Bar Council of Ukraine, holding these positions until the present. 

In 2019, following the selection procedure, Valentyn Gvozdiy was elected as an independent member (independent director) of the Supervisory Board of Ukrhydroenergo PJSC. In the same year, he was elected as the Head of the Supervisory Board of Ukrhydroenergo PJSC.

Recognition 

During 2017–2021, Valentyn Gvozdiy received several Ukrainian and foreign awards. In particular, in 2017 he was awarded the title of “Honored Lawyer of Ukraine”.

In 2020 he was awarded the title ”Thought Leader” in the “Who's Who Legal” 2020. In the same year, following the results of “The Legal 500” EMEA, he was recommended in the areas of labor, criminal, tax law, and dispute resolution. In the same year, following the results of “Ukrainian Law firms: a Handbook for Foreign Clients” 2020, he was recognized among the best lawyers of Ukraine in the areas of taxation and transfer pricing: litigation; taxation and transfer pricing: advising; court practice.

On June 4, 2021, the annual “Legal Awards” ceremony took place during which Valentyn Gvozdiy, the Managing Partner at GOLAW, received a prestigious award “Corporate Governance Lawyer of the Year”.

In 2021 Valentyn Gvozdiy received high recognition according to the international research program “Best Lawyers” and was included in the twelfth edition of “The Best Lawyers In Ukraine” 2022. In addition, he received high recognition in the “Who’s Who Legal” international research program. Valentyn Gvozdiy became the only attorney in Ukraine recognized as a leading specialist in corporate tax: controversy.

References 

1979 births
Living people
Ukrainian chief executives
21st-century Ukrainian lawyers
21st-century Ukrainian businesspeople